The traditional Mongol calendar (tsaglabar or , tsag toony bichig) is a lunisolar calendar based on  system developed in 1747 by monk Ishbaljir (Sümbe khambo Ishbaljir; 1704–1788). The Mongol year is composed of either 12 or 13 lunar months, each beginning and ending with a new moon. A thirteenth month is added every two or three years, so that an average year is equal to the solar year.

The Mongol traditional new year celebration is Tsagaan Sar which is celebrated at the second new moon following the winter solstice. In 2022, the second new moon was on 1 February in Mongolia.  

In modern Mongolia, the Gregorian calendar is used, with the traditional calendar only used for traditional celebrations and events based on the calendar.

The European system of chronology is called Аргын тоолол (chronology of method) and the Mongol system of chronology is called Билгийн тоолол (chronology of wisdom).

Argyn Toolol

Months 
The twelve months of the year are referred to by their number, such as first month, second month, and so on.

Days of the week 
In colloquial usage, the first 5 days of the week are referred to as first day, second day, etc. Saturday is referred to as Хагас сайн өдөр (Khagas sain ödör, "half-good day"), and Sunday is referred to as Бүтэн сайн өдөр (Büten sain ödör, "full good day"); a result of 5 full working days and Saturday as a half working day during the communist era.

The names of Tibetan origin are used in more formal settings, and almost exclusively in written documents, while the Sanskrit names are practically absent in modern usage.

See also  
Public holidays in Mongolia

Footnotes 

Calendars
Calendar